Pontoon is a lakeside village on the R310 regional road in County Mayo in Ireland, situated between Lough Conn and Lough Cullin, and near the town of Foxford.

The dance hall in Pontoon attracted large numbers of people to its week-end dances from a large catchment area.

See also
 List of towns and villages in Ireland

References

External link

Towns and villages in County Mayo